In mathematics, the Lions–Magenes lemma (or theorem) is the result in the theory of Sobolev spaces of Banach space-valued functions, which provides a criterion for moving a time derivative of a function out of its action (as a functional) on the function itself.

Statement of the lemma 
Let X0, X and X1 be three Hilbert spaces with X0 ⊆ X ⊆ X1. Suppose that X0 is continuously embedded in X and that X is continuously embedded in X1, and that X1 is the dual space of X0. Suppose for some  that  is such that its time derivative . Then  is almost everywhere equal to a function continuous from  into , and moreover the following equality holds in the sense of scalar distributions on :

The above inequality is meaningful, since the functions

See also 
 Aubin–Lions lemma

Notes 

References

  (Lemma 1.2)

 

Lemmas in analysis